Platynota wenzelana is a species of moth of the family Tortricidae. It is found in the United States in Arizona and New Mexico.

The wingspan is 20–24 mm.

References

Moths described in 1915
Platynota (moth)